Wanyjok may refer to:

 Wanyjok FC, a football club
 Wanyjok, South Sudan, a town in the Aweil East county of the Republic of South Sudan